Gary Nodler (born August 10, 1950) is a Missouri politician who served as a Republican in the Missouri State Senate, where he chaired the Senate Appropriations Committee. He is a resident of Joplin, Missouri, married to the former Joncee Edwards with one son, Justin and one granddaughter Rachel.

Biography 
He was born in Champaign, Illinois raised in Neosho, Missouri, and attended Crowder College and Missouri Southern State University, where he received his B.A. degree in political science. He has served in the United States Army and in the Missouri National Guard. He is a member of the First Christian Church of Webb City, the American Legion. In 1985, he was selected as one of the Outstanding Young Men in America.

He served as Congressman Gene Taylor's district staff director from 1973 to 1988. He became a regional administrator of the Small Business Administration in 1989, serving through 1992. He was also a member of the Rural Economic Policy Working Group of the White House Economic Policy Council from 1991 to 1992. He served as staff for the Missouri Congressional delegation from 1997 through 2000. He was first elected to the Missouri State Senate in 2002. Nodler wrote Senate Bill 55 elevating Missouri Southern State College to university status and renaming it Missouri Southern State University.  He also authored Senate Bill 389 which included the Lewis & Clark Discovery Initiative, providing capital improvements to Missouri higher education institutions, including $20 million to Missouri Southern State University for the school's new Health Sciences Building. He served as Assistant Majority Floor Leader and on the following committees:
Appropriations-Chairman,
Education-Chairman,
Pensions/ Veterans' Affairs and General Laws,
Joint Committee on Capital Improvements and Leases Oversight,
Joint Committee on Education,
Joint Committee on Government Accountability,
Joint Committee on Legislative Research and Oversight-Chairman, 
Joint Committee on the Life Sciences.

After leaving the Senate, Nodler served 3 years on the Board of the Joplin Sports Authority and also served as a member of the Joplin School Board.  In August 2018 he was appointed by Governor Mike Parson to the Missouri Coordinating Board for Higher Education, In December 2022 he was elected chairman of the board,

Awards 
Awards Presented to Senator Nodler:
 Missouri Laborers' "Legislator of the Year" Award, 2003
 Missouri Southern State University Outstanding Alumnus, 2003
 Missouri Association for Career and Technical Education Legislative Recognition Award, 2005
 Missouri Community College Association Distinguished Legislator Award, 2005
 Missouri Chamber of Commerce and Industry "100% For Jobs" Award, 2005
 American Institute of Architects Appreciation Award, 2006 and 2008
 The Missouri Bar's Legislative Award, 2007
 Missouri Court Appointed Special Advocates Association Legislative Award, 2007
 Missouri Society of Professional Engineers Legislator of Year Award, 2007
 Missouri Chamber of Commerce & Industry Spirit of Enterprise Award, 2007
 LIFT Missouri, Legislators For Literacy Award, 2008
 Gateway Chapter of the Autism Society of America Certificate of Recognition, 2008
 St. Louis Business Journal Legislative Award, 2008
 Missouri Healthcare Association Senior Advocate of the Year, 2009
 St. Louis Regional Chamber and Growth Association Lewis & Clark Statesman Award, 2009
 Judicial Conference of Missouri, Recognition for the Advancement of the Administration of Justice in Missouri, 2009
 Freeman Health Care, Freeman Fellow
 Missouri Association of Veterans Organizations Legislator of the Year, 2010
 Richard M. Webster Medallion for public Service, 2018

References 

1950 births
Living people
Politicians from Joplin, Missouri
Crowder College alumni
Missouri Southern State University alumni
Republican Party Missouri state senators